Princess Royal Reach is the second arm of Jervis Inlet and is located within the Coast Mountain Range of British Columbia, Canada.

See also
List of fjords in Canada

References

External links 
CM_C2308 Fraser River to N.E.Pt. of Texada Island including Howe Sound and Jervis Inlet 'Annotated'  1863.02.16 1865.08
BCGNIS Geographical Geographical Name Detail for Princess Royal Reach

Fjords of British Columbia
Coast of British Columbia
Sunshine Coast Regional District
New Westminster Land District
Inlets of British Columbia